Franck Bernhard (born March 7, 1976 in Strasbourg) is a retired French professional football player.

1976 births
Living people
French people of German descent
French footballers
Ligue 1 players
RC Strasbourg Alsace players
French expatriate footballers
Expatriate footballers in Belgium
Cercle Brugge K.S.V. players
Expatriate footballers in Scotland
Scottish Premier League players
Motherwell F.C. players
FC Mulhouse players
Vendée Fontenay Foot players
Association football defenders